This is a list of business schools in South Carolina, arranged in alphabetical order.

References

 
South Carolina